Franz Joseph Antony (1790–1837) was a choral composer.

He was born at Münster, Westphalia, received Holy Orders, and in 1819 became choirmaster at St. Paul's Cathedral in Münster, succeeding his father as organist, in 1832. In addition to some songs, he published four choral masses. His erudite works are Archäologisch-liturgisches Gesangbuch des Gregorianischen Kirchengesanges (1829) and Geschichtliche Darstellung der Entstehung und Vervollkommnung der Orgel (1832).

See also

References

Sources

German classical organists
German male organists
German classical composers
Classical composers of church music
1790 births
1837 deaths
German male classical composers
19th-century German musicians
19th-century German male musicians
Male classical organists
19th-century organists